The following is a list of regulators in the UK. Regulators exercise regulatory or supervisory authority over a variety of endeavours.

In addition, local authorities in the UK provide regulatory functions in a number of areas. Professional associations also act to regulate their memberships. The UK is also bound by a number of European and other trans-national regulators, not listed here.

Charities
 Charity Commission for England and Wales
 Charity Commission for Northern Ireland
 Office of the Scottish Charity Regulator

Education
 The General Teaching Councils for Scotland, Wales and Northern Ireland
Ofqual – Office of Qualifications and Examinations Regulation
Ofsted – Office for Standards in Education, Children's Services and Skills
Office for Students (OfS)

Environment
 Environment Agency (EA)
 Marine Management Organisation (MMO)
 Natural Resources Wales (NRW)
 Northern Ireland Environment Agency (NIEA)
 Scottish Environment Protection Agency (SEPA)

Business and finance
 Bank of England 
 Financial Conduct Authority (FCA)
 The Office for Professional Body Anti-Money Laundering Supervision (OPBAS)
 Financial Reporting Council, expected to be replaced by the Audit, Reporting and Governance Authority in 2023
 Institute of Chartered Accountants in England and Wales
 Office of the Regulator of Community Interest Companies (ORCIC)
 Payment Systems Regulator (PSR)
 Pensions Regulator
 Prudential Regulation Authority (PRA)

Health
 Care Quality Commission (CQC)
 Complementary and Natural Healthcare Council (CNHC)
 General Chiropractic Council (GCC) 
 General Dental Council (GDC) 
 General Medical Council (GMC)
 General Optical Council (GOC)
 General Osteopathic Council (GOsC)
 General Pharmaceutical Council (GPhC)
 Health and Care Professions Council (HCPC) – fifteen professions with designated titles
 Health and Safety Executive
 Healthcare Inspectorate Wales (HIW)
 Healthcare Safety Investigation Branch (HSIB)
 Human Fertilisation and Embryology Authority
 Human Tissue Authority (HTA)
 Medicines and Healthcare products Regulatory Agency (MHRA)
 NHS Improvement (NHSI)
 Nursing and Midwifery Council (NMC)
 Pharmaceutical Society of Northern Ireland (PSNI)
 Professional Standards Authority for Health and Social Care
 Royal College of Veterinary Surgeons (RCVS)
 UK Health Security Agency (UKHSA)

Housing
 Regulator of Social Housing
 Scottish Housing Regulator

Law
 Authorised Conveyancing Practitioners Board
Bar Standards Board
 CILEx Regulation
 Faculty of Advocates
 Law Society of Northern Ireland
 Law Society of Scotland
 Master of the Faculties
 Office of the Immigration Services Commissioner
 Solicitors Regulation Authority
 Costs Lawyer Standards Board
 Council for Licensed Conveyancers

Social care
 Care Quality Commission (CQC)
 Scottish Care Inspectorate
 Care Council for Wales (CCW)
 Social Work England
 Northern Ireland Social Care Council (NISCC)
 Scottish Social Services Council (SSSC)

Transport
 Civil Aviation Authority (CAA)
 Office of Rail and Road (ORR)

Utilities
 Ofcom – independent regulator and competition authority for the UK communications industries 
 Phone-paid Services Authority – regulator for phone-paid services in the UK, part of Ofcom, replaces ICSTIS, PhonepayPlus 
 Office for Nuclear Regulation (ONR)
 Ofgem – the Office of the Gas and Electricity Markets
 Ofwat – the Water Services Regulation Authority 
 The Utility Regulator – regulating electricity, gas, water and sewerage industries in Northern Ireland
 Water Industry Commission for Scotland

Others
 Accreditation Service
Advertising Standards Authority 
 British Board of Film Classification
 Chartered Institute for the Management of Sport and Physical Activity
 Competition and Markets Authority 
 Council for Registered Gas Installers
 Direct Marketing Authority
 Engineering Council – the regulatory body for the engineering profession
 Equality and Human Rights Commission
 Food Standards Agency
 Forensic Science Regulator
 Fundraising Regulator
 Gambling Commission
 Gangmasters and Labour Abuse Authority
 HM Revenue and Customs
 IMPRESS
 Independent Press Standards Organisation
 Information Commissioner's Office
 North Sea Transition Authority
 Planning Inspectorate
 Independent Office for Police Conduct
 Security Industry Authority

See also
 List of professional associations in the United Kingdom

References

 
Regulators in the United Kingdom
United Kingdom